Eastland Center may refer to:

 Eastland Center (California), in West Covina, California
 Eastland Center (Michigan), in Harper Woods, Michigan

See also 
 Eastland (disambiguation)